Until the Whole World Hears... Live is a live CD/DVD by the Christian rock band Casting Crowns. It was recorded on April 24, 2010 at the Greensboro Coliseum in North Carolina, and released on August 31, 2010 by Reunion Records.

Track listing

CD 
"Until the Whole World Hears" (Roger Glidewell, Mark Hall, Bernie Herms, Jason McArthur) - 5:13
"If We've Ever Needed You" (Hall, Herms) - 3:42
"Glorious Day (Living He Loved Me)" (Michael Bleecker, Hall) - 4:42
"Mercy" (Sam De Jong, Hall, Omega Levine, Tauese Tofa) - 5:37
"To Know You" (Hall, Herms, Ingram) - 4:22
"Holy One" (Matt Bronleewe, Hall, Jason Ingram, Stu G) - 3:35
"Blessed Redeemer" (Hall, Herms) - 4:05
"At Your Feet" (Hall, Ingram) - 6:34

DVD 

"Until the Whole World Hears" (Roger Glidewell, Mark Hall, Bernie Herms, Jason McArthur) - 5:13
"If We've Ever Needed You" (Hall, Herms) - 3:42
"Glorious Day (Living He Loved Me)" (Michael Bleecker, Hall) - 4:42
"Mercy" (Sam De Jong, Hall, Omega Levine, Tauese Tofa) - 5:37
"Holy One" (Matt Bronleewe, Hall, Jason Ingram, Stu G) - 4:22
"To Know You" (Hall, Herms, Ingram) - 3:35
"Blessed Redeemer" (Hall, Herms) - 4:05
"At Your Feet" (Hall, Ingram) - 6:34

Awards

The album was nominated for a Dove Award for Long Form Music Video of the Year at the 42nd GMA Dove Awards.

References

Casting Crowns albums
2010 live albums
Christian live video albums
Events in Greensboro, North Carolina